The Roaring Silence is the seventh studio album by English rock band Manfred Mann's Earth Band. It was released on 27 August 1976, by Bronze Records in the UK and by Warner Bros. Records in the US. Like other Earth Band albums, this includes material by other composers. "Blinded by the Light", which reached number one on the Billboard Hot 100, is a cover version of a song by Bruce Springsteen; "Questions" is based on the main theme of Franz Schubert's Impromptu in G flat Major (1827); "Starbird" takes its theme from Igor Stravinsky's ballet The Firebird (1910); and "The Road to Babylon" is based on the canon "By the Waters of Babylon" by Philip Hayes. This album marked the arrival of vocalist/guitarist Chris Hamlet Thompson, and Dave Flett who replaced longtime guitarist/vocalist/composer Mick Rogers. It is also the last album recorded with founding member Colin Pattenden.

The instrumental track "Waiter, There's a Yawn in My Ear" is based on a live recording (with studio overdubs added later). The album’s cover art is a visualization of this track’s title. Its main riff is taken from the Manfred Mann Chapter Three track "Fish" which was recorded for their abandoned third album. It was ultimately released in 2005 on the Odds & Sods – Mis-takes & Out-takes box set.

Track listing 

There were two pressings of this album available in the U.S. The original, shown here, and a reissue from 1977 with a blue cover which included "Spirit In The Night", another Springsteen song which had previously been released on Nightingales & Bombers and was now re-recorded with Chris Thompson taking lead vocals, in between "The Road to Babylon" and "This Side of Paradise". The first CD-release (1987) of this album did not contain bonus tracks, and tracks No. 3 and No. 7 had changed places.

Personnel

The Earth Band
 Chris Hamlet Thompson – lead vocals, rhythm guitar
 Manfred Mann – keyboards, backing vocals, lead vocals on the final verse of “Blinded By The Light”
 Dave Flett – lead guitar
 Colin Pattenden – bass
 Chris Slade – drums, backing vocals, percussion

Additional musicians
 Doreen Chanter – backing vocals
 Irene Chanter – backing vocals
 Susanne Lynch – backing vocals
 Mick Rogers – backing vocals
 Barbara Thompson – saxophone
 David Millman – string arrangements

Technical
 Manfred Mann's Earth Band – producers
 Laurence Latham – engineer
 David Culpan, Margaret Wood, Tony Rowell, Edwin Cross – assistant engineers
 Shirtsleeve Studio – design. Modelled by artist Derek Goldsmith
 Martyn Goddard – photography

Charts

Weekly charts

Year-end charts

Certifications

References

External links
 Manfred Mann's Earth Band - The Roaring Silence (1976) album releases & credits at Discogs
 Manfred Mann's Earth Band - The Roaring Silence (1976) album credits & user reviews at ProgArchives.com
 Manfred Mann's Earth Band - The Roaring Silence (1976) album to be listened on Spotify

Manfred Mann's Earth Band albums
1976 albums
Bronze Records albums
Warner Records albums